Armando Mance (born 27 October 1992) is a Croatian professional footballer who plays for NK Vinodol.

Club career

MFK Ružomberok
He made his professional debut for Ružomberok on 18 October 2014 against Dunajská Streda.

OŠK Omišalj
Mance left Inter Bratislava at the end of 2017 and was without club until September 2019, where he joined NK OŠK Omišalj.

Personal life
An older brother of Antonio Mance, Armando also works as his brother's agent.

References

External links
 MFK Ružomberok profile 
 
 Nogometni Magazin profile 
 Eurofotbal profile 

1992 births
Living people
Footballers from Rijeka
Association football forwards
Croatian footballers
Croatia youth international footballers
HNK Rijeka players
NK Grobničan players
NK Pomorac 1921 players
NK Solin players
MFK Ružomberok players
FC ViOn Zlaté Moravce players
FK Borac Banja Luka players
FK Inter Bratislava players
Croatian Football League players
First Football League (Croatia) players
Slovak Super Liga players
Premier League of Bosnia and Herzegovina players
2. Liga (Slovakia) players
Croatian expatriate footballers
Expatriate footballers in Slovakia
Croatian expatriate sportspeople in Slovakia
Expatriate footballers in Bosnia and Herzegovina
Croatian expatriate sportspeople in Bosnia and Herzegovina